The 1986 United States Senate election in New Hampshire was held on November 4, 1986. Incumbent Republican U.S. Senator Warren Rudman won re-election to a second term.

Major candidates

Democratic
 Endicott Peabody, former Governor of Massachusetts

Republican
 Warren Rudman, incumbent U.S. Senator

Results

See also 
 1986 United States Senate elections

References 

New Hampshire
1986
United States Senate